American singer and songwriter Mike Posner has released four studio albums, two extended plays, four mixtapes, two poetry albums, 25 singles (including eight as a featured artist), and 14 music videos (including one as a featured artist). Posner has written songs for Justin Bieber, Maroon 5, Labrinth, Nick Jonas, Nelly, Big Sean, Avicii, Austin Mahone and others.

Posner's debut studio album 31 Minutes to Takeoff was released on August 10, 2010. "Cooler than Me" was released as the lead single from the album on April 16, 2010. The song reached the top ten in the US peaking at number six, the song also peaked to number three in New Zealand and number three in Canada. It sold over 3,000,000 downloads in the US. "Please Don't Go" was released as the second single from the album on June 9, 2010, peaking at number 16 in the US. "Bow Chicka Wow Wow" was released as the third single from the album on February 3, 2011, and features vocals from American rapper Lil Wayne, peaking at number 30 in the US.

In 2016, his 2015 single "I Took a Pill in Ibiza" was remixed by SeeB and became his comeback hit after five years.

Albums

Studio albums

Collaboration albums

Mixtapes

Poetry albums

Extended plays

Singles

As lead artist

As featured artist

Promotional singles

Guest appearances

Music videos

Writing credits

References

Notes

Sources

Pop music discographies
Discographies of American artists